Hino may refer to:

Places

Estonia
 Hino, Põlva County
 Hino, Võru County
 Lake Hino

Japan
 Hino, Shiga
 Hino, Tokyo
 Hino, Tottori
 Hino District, Tottori
 Hino River

Transportation
 Hino Motors, a Japanese truck manufacturer owned by Toyota
 Hino Pakistan
 Hino Station (disambiguation), railway stations in Japan:
 Hino Station (Nagano), a railway station Susuka, Nagano, operated by Nagano Electric Railway
 Hino Station (Shiga), a railway station operated by Ohmi Railway
 Hino Station (Tokyo), a railway station operated by East Japan Railway Company

Other uses
 Hino (surname), a Japanese surname
 Hé-no, also called Hino, an Iroquois thunder spirit

See also
 Heino (disambiguation)